Galíndez is a novel by Manuel Vázquez Montalbán, published in 1990. It centres on a real, dramatic and dark episode of the history of the Dominican Republic: the kidnapping, torturing and murdering of Jesús de Galíndez in 1956, representative of the Basque government in exile before the U.S. State Department and the involvement and cover-up by the CIA. The novel received Spain's National Literary Award in 1991 and the Europa Prize.

The detective and narrator of the novel is Muriel Corbert. She is a history graduate who seeks out the truth of Galíndez' fate. In doing so she travels from the United States, to Spain and then the Dominican Republic, and uncovers a conspiracy between Dominican dictator Rafael Trujillo, the CIA and Francoist Spain. 

The novel was made into a film in 2003, called El Misterio Galíndez (literally "The Galindez Mystery", but also known as "The Galíndez File"). The film stars Saffron Burrows and Harvey Keitel.

References 

1991 novels
Novels by Manuel Vázquez Montalbán
20th-century Spanish novels
Novels set in the Dominican Republic
Spanish novels adapted into films